, 41 places are heritage-listed in the City of Joondalup, of which one is on the State Register of Heritage Places, the Luisini Winery. The State Register of Heritage Places is maintained by the Heritage Council of Western Australia.

List

State Register of Heritage Places
The Western Australian State Register of Heritage Places, lists the following state registered place within the City of Joondalup:

City of Joondalup heritage-listed places
The following places are heritage listed in the City of Joondalup but are not State registered:

References

Joondalup
City of Joondalup